Trichopsocus brincki is a species of Psocoptera from the Trichopsocidae family that can be found in England and Wales. The species are brown coloured.

Habitat
The species feeds on blackthorn, elder, gorse, pine, and yew. The species also like to eat Douglas-fir and spruce cones.

References

Trichopsocidae
Insects described in 1963
Psocoptera of Europe